Crimewatch Live (previously known as Crimewatch Roadshow Live or simply Crimewatch Roadshow and originally as Crimewatch Daily) is a British television programme produced by BBC Studios Documentary Unit Cymru Wales, that reconstructs major unsolved crimes in order to gain information from the public which may assist in solving them. The programme is broadcast on BBC One.

History

2000–2001: Crimewatch Daily
First aired on 27 November 2000, Crimewatch Daily was the initial daily version of the original Crimewatch programme, aired between 10:00 and 11:00am on weekday mornings, that appealed for help with unsolved cases not covered in the main programme. Broadcast from a specially designed studio at New Scotland Yard, the series was presented by Phil Gayle and Jane Moore. Two further series aired throughout 2001, before the final edition was broadcast on 7 December 2001.

2009–2020: Crimewatch Roadshow
First broadcast on 1 June 2009, Crimewatch Roadshow was the second daily version of the BBC's Crimewatch programme, that was broadcast on weekdays from 9:15 to 10:00am. From 2009, the main Crimewatch programme did not broadcast in June, being instead replaced by twenty shows broadcast on a daily basis throughout the month. The Crimewatch Roadshow broadcast live from a different area of the country for each episode, often containing features on how the local police force helps to solve everyday crime. In October 2017, it was announced that following the cancellation of the main programme, it would now broadcast two series per year.

12 series of the show have been broadcast. Rav Wilding has presented all 12 series, first appearing as a co-presenter alongside Sophie Raworth before being promoted to main anchor from the second series onwards. Ginny Buckley, Miriam O'Reilly, Dave Guest, Alice Bandhukvari, Nicola Rees, Sian Lloyd, Sonali Shah, Michelle Ackerley and Tina Daheley have all appeared as co-presenters throughout the series' run. During the fifth series, former Crimewatch presenter Jacqui Hames co-presented every Friday, updating viewers on success stories from years past.

2021: Crimewatch Live
First broadcast on 8 March 2021, Crimewatch Live is the third and current daily version of the BBC's Crimewatch programme, that broadcasts on weekday mornings orginially from 11:00 to 11:45am before moving an hour earlier from September 2021. It is now filmed in BBC Cymru Wales New Broadcasting House, Cardiff, with presenters Rav Wilding and Michelle Ackerley in the studio, and John Paul Davies reporting on scene.

Show format
Broadcasting on weekday mornings, at various times over the years, it features approximately three or four cases per show with each case featuring reconstructions of the crime. It is one of the largest live factual studio productions. The films shown often feature interviews with senior detectives and/or relatives or friends of victims. Key evidence is usually shown, such as E-FIT profiles of suspects and details of certain lines of enquiry.

Other features to the show include a "CCTV section", which showed crimes caught on CCTV with enhanced imagery of suspects. A "Wanted Faces" section was also featured: four close-up pictures of suspects police are trying to trace are shown on screen. This section also frequently involves information about suspects, including aliases. These four photos are shown upon the programme's closing credits, one of the few programmes in which the BBC do not 'show the credits in reduced size'.

Viewers can contact the show by phoning 08000 468 999, with the phone lines remaining open until 12:30pm on the morning of the programme. Viewers can also send text messages to 63399 24/7. Due to the high demand for cases to be shown on the programme, many other cases are added to the website. These are joined by reconstructions, CCTV footage and wanted faces that have been shown on previous programmes. All reconstructions, CCTV footage, faces and cases remain on the Crimewatch Live website until the criminals are caught or suspects convicted. Each programme can be watched on the BBC iPlayer catch-up service for 24 hours (later increased to seven days) from broadcast.

Presenters

Crimewatch Daily

Crimewatch Roadshow (Crimewatch Live since 2021)

Transmissions

Crimewatch Daily

Crimewatch Roadshow (Crimewatch Live since 2021)

See also
Crimewatch
Crimewatch File
Crime Limited

References

External links

2000 British television series debuts
2000s British crime television series
2010s British crime television series
2020s British crime television series
BBC crime television shows
Law enforcement in the United Kingdom
British television series based on non-British television series
British television series revived after cancellation
Television series by BBC Studios
Live